Opinions was a British talk programme broadcast on Channel 4 television in the 1980s and 1990s. According to Time magazine, Opinions gave "a public figure 30-minutes of airtime each week to expound on a controversial topic (Germaine Greer on Margaret Thatcher, Edward Teller on nuclear defence)". "A speaker could express his or her own views straight to camera for 30 minutes" "an earnest of Channel 4's faith and mission to bring edgy, alternative fare to the public and to excite reaction".

During the time it was produced by Open Media, the series featured such figures as Edward de Bono, Alan Clark, Linda Colley, Brian Cox, James Goldsmith, Paul Hill, Dusan Makavejev, G.F. Newman, George Soros and Norman Stone. One - by Dennis Potter, in 1993 - was given a cinema screening by the BFI in July 2014.

Among those appearing in the Opinions 1993 debate in Westminster Central Hall about democracy in Britain chaired by Vincent Hanna were Zaki Badawi, Christine Crawley, Paul Ekins, Christopher Hitchens, Paul Kennedy, Michael Mansfield, David Miliband, Geoff Mulgan, Vincent Nichols, Janet Paraskeva, Jonathan Sacks, Nancy Seear, Roger Scruton, Anthony Smith and Crispin Tickell.

References

1985 British television series debuts
1994 British television series endings
Channel 4 original programming
British non-fiction television series
1980s British political television series
1990s British political television series
British television series revived after cancellation
English-language television shows